John Benson Williams (born June 1, 1970) is an American professional wrestler better known by his ring name Ian Rotten. He has wrestled in the Global Wrestling Federation (GWF), Extreme Championship Wrestling (ECW), the  United States Wrestling Association (USWA), and his own wrestling promotion IWA: Mid-South.

Professional wrestling career

Early career
After becoming a fan of Dusty Rhodes and "Superstar" Billy Graham while growing up in Florida and Baltimore, Maryland, John Williams, began his career under the name Johnny Lawler, the storyline illegitimate son of Jerry "The King" Lawler. After a short stint as hockey gimmick Zach Blades, Williams went to wrestle in the Global Wrestling Federation.

The Bad Breed

In GWF, Williams formed The Bad Breed, a tag team with Brian Knighton as brothers Ian and Axl Rotten, respectively. They defeated the Texas Mustangs (Bobby Duncum, Jr. & Johnny Hawk) for the GWF Tag Team Championship in January 1993, losing the titles shortly thereafter. In June 1994 in Extreme Championship Wrestling, the Bad Breed started a feud with The Public Enemy over the ECW Tag Team Championship, but never won the title.

Later career
The Rotten brothers briefly feuded with each other prior to Williams' termination from ECW in late 1995. He moved to Kentucky, where he started a wrestling hotline followed by the IWA Mid-South promotion in early 1996. IWA was controversial for its use of violent and bloody hardcore wrestling. In 2008, IWA and Williams were investigated by Indiana State Police over the violence in their shows. In 2011, IWA shut down and was restarted by a third party, with Williams making occasional appearances.

Personal life
Williams is the father of John Calvin Glenn, known also by the ring name of J.C. Rotten.

Championships and accomplishments
ACW Tag Team Championship (1 time) - with Drake Younger
Global Wrestling Federation
GWF Tag Team Championship (1 time) - with Axl Rotten
Independent Wrestling Association Mid-South
IWA Mid-South Heavyweight Championship (8 times)
IWA Mid-South Tag Team Championship (5 times) - with Axl Rotten (2), Cash Flo (1), Tarek the Great (1) and Mad Man Pondo (1)
IWA Mid-South King of the Deathmatch (1997, 2001)
Juggalo Championship Wrestling
JCW Tag Team Championship (1 times) - with Lane Bloody
NWA New Jersey
NWA United States Tag Team Championship (New Jersey version) (1 time) - with Blaze
NWA Revolution
NWA Revolution Tag Team Championship (1 time) - with Danny McKay
Westside Xtreme Wrestling
wXw World Heavyweight Championship (1 time)
wXw Hardcore Championship (1 time)

References

External link 
 

1970 births
American male professional wrestlers
Living people
Professional wrestling promoters
People from Baltimore
Professional wrestlers from Maryland
20th-century professional wrestlers
21st-century professional wrestlers
GWF Tag Team Champions